Us Weekly is a weekly celebrity and entertainment magazine based in New York City. Us Weekly was founded in 1977 by The New York Times Company, who sold it in 1980. It was acquired by Wenner Media in 1986, and sold to American Media Inc. in 2017. Shortly afterward, former editor James Heidenry stepped down, and was replaced by Jennifer Peros. The chief content officer of American Media, Dylan Howard, oversees the publication.

Us Weekly covers topics ranging from celebrity relationships to the latest trends in fashion, beauty, and entertainment. As of 2017, its paid circulation averaged to more than 1.95 million copies weekly and total readership of more than 50 million consumers.

The magazine currently features a sharply different style from its original 1977–2000 format. Originally a monthly industry news and review magazine along the lines of Premiere or Entertainment Weekly, it switched format in 2000 to its current themes of celebrity news and style.

The web site Usmagazine.com was launched in fall 2006. In addition to features from the magazine, the site has a breaking celebrity news blog, exclusive photos, red carpet galleries from premieres and events, plus games, videos, quizzes and polls.

Us Weekly has several signature issues each year, including the Hot Hollywood special issues, in the spring and the fall celebrating young Hollywood; the Best Bodies issue and the Best Makeovers issue. Janet Jackson's June 5, 2006, Us Weekly cover currently holds the record for the publication's biggest selling issue in history.

History 
Launched as a fortnightly publication in 1977, Us by the New York Times Company. The magazine lost money before turning its first profit in 1980. It was sold later that year to Macfadden Media. It was acquired by Jann Wenner in 1985 and is a part of Wenner Media LLC, which also publishes Rolling Stone and Men's Journal. In 1991, Us became a monthly publication.

In 1999, the company announced plans to shift the Us publication schedule from monthly to weekly. The shift coincided with a change in style from industry news and reviews to a celebrity-focused news magazine. The move was a response to several market forces, including the success of Time, Inc.’s Entertainment Weekly and People magazines. Wenner expressed his intention to keep Us "celebrity-friendly" in contrast with the more gossipy character of its competitors. He told The New York Times: "We will be nice to celebrities. A lot of my friends are in the entertainment business."  The publication focuses on celebrity fashion as well as Hollywood gossip. Kelli Delaney, current New York designer for Members Only, formerly served as fashion director of the publication (1992–95). The change took effect in March 2000.

In February 2001, Wenner partnered with The Walt Disney Company. Bonnie Fuller worked as editor-in-chief of the publication from 2002 to 2003. She redesigned the title, creating the modern celebrity newsweekly. She created such signature sections as "Stars Are Just Like Us." In July 2003, Janice Min took over as editor in chief with Victoria Lasdon Rose as publisher, and Michael Steele as executive editor. Steele took over for Min in 2009. Melanie Bromley served as the magazine's West Coast bureau chief from 2007 to 2012.

In August 2006, Wenner Media re-acquired Disney's 50 percent stake, making the publication once again fully owned and operated by Wenner Media. In 2017, the publication was sold to American Media, Inc.

Timeline
 1977: Us founded by The New York Times Company
 1980: Us acquired by Peter J. Callahan's Macfadden Group.
The staff of Photoplay and TV Mirror, the merger of Photoplay, Movie Mirror, and TV-Radio Mirror, is merged.
 1986: Us acquired by Straight Arrow Publishers, Inc., now known as Wenner Media LLC
 1991: Us changes its bi-weekly frequency to become monthly
 March 2000: Us changes from a monthly format and goes weekly, changing its title
 February 2001: Us Weekly partners with The Walt Disney Company
 January 2006: Us Weekly increases rate base to 1.75 Million
 July 2006: Us Weekly launches Usmagazine.com
 August 2006: Wenner Media re-acquires Disney's 50 percent stake in Us Weekly
 March 2017: American Media, Inc. bought Us Weekly from Wenner Media LLC

Sections of the magazine 

 Just Like Us: photos of celebrities doing things everyday people do. Inspired by a regular Sesame Street feature about animals
 Who Wore It Best?: reader polls of which celebrity wore an outfit better
 Hot Stuff: the latest gossip from inside Hollywood
 The Red Carpet: the looks and styles from Hollywood's hottest parties and premieres
 Hot Pics: celebrity sightings of stars around the globe
 Fashion Police: famous comedians cite the fashion disasters of the stars, and the best "look of the week"
 The Record: a roster of changes in the lives of stars—births, marriages, divorces, etc.
 Loose Talk: quotes from the stars
 Us Musts: according to Us Weekly, the must-see films, TV shows and DVDs

In the media 
In a July 2006 Variety article, Janice Min, Us Weekly editor-in-chief, cited People for the increase in cost to publishers of celebrity photos:

In a June 2007 New York article, Tina Brown was asked, "Do you actually read the tabloids?"

From a May 2007 New York Post article profiling New York's 50 Most Powerful Women,

Of her front cover appearance in November 1997, Courtney Love remarked,

The magazine was criticized for allegedly biased coverage of the 2008 Republican National Convention. The September 5, 2008, issue featured Alaska Governor Sarah Palin on the cover with the headline "Babies, Lies & Scandal", while the June 19, 2008, issue featured U.S. Senator from Illinois Barack Obama and wife Michelle Obama with the headline "Why Barack Loves Her". Senior Editor Bradley Jacobs claimed that the "lies" on the cover referred to unspecified "liberal bloggers" who had speculated on the parentage of Governor Palin's child, not to the governor herself. However, nothing on the cover indicated "liberal bloggers" were the alleged liars. It was reported that the magazine had lost over 10,000 subscribers. Since then it was reported that Us Weekly sent e-mails to each of those subscribers, apologizing for the cover, and promised to send them five free copies of the magazine.

In 2009, Us Weekly partnered with Involver to become the first media company to sell sponsorships on their Facebook Page.

Recognition 
 Adweeks "The Hot List: Top 10 Magazines" 2004, 2005, 2006, 2007
 Advertising Ages Magazine of the Year, 2004
 Adweek Magazine's Editor of the Year, editor in chief Janice Min
 Advertising Age A-List, No. 3 in 2005, No. 1 in 2004
 Capell's Circulation Report "Top 10 Best Performers in Circulation" in 2005

References

External links
 
 The Official Jann S. Wenner Website

Lifestyle magazines published in the United States
Weekly magazines published in the United States
Celebrity magazines published in the United States
Magazines established in 1977
Magazines published in New York City
Biweekly magazines published in the United States
Supermarket tabloids